The wattled guan (Aburria aburri) is a species of bird in the family Cracidae. It is a fairly large black cracid with blue-based, black-tipped beak and a long, red-and-yellow wattle.

It is found in Colombia, Ecuador, Peru, and Venezuela. Its natural habitats are subtropical or tropical moist lowland forest and subtropical or tropical moist montane forest. The wattled guan is a fairly shy species that is mostly seen when it perches on the outer edge of the canopy from a distance. Like many tropical forest birds, it is heard more often than seen. It is threatened by habitat destruction and the IUCN has assessed its conservation status as being "near threatened".

Description
The wattled guan is recognisable by the elongated red and yellow fleshy wattle that dangles from its throat. The plumage is black, the beak is blue and the feet are flesh-coloured.

Distribution and habitat
The wattled guan is endemic to the foothills of the Andes in South America. Its range extends from northwestern Venezuela through Colombia, Ecuador and Bolivia to southern Peru. It used to be found on the western slopes of the Andes but this is believed no longer to be the case. On the eastern slopes it is rare in Venezuela but slightly more common in Colombia. Its natural habitat is wet mountain forest and woodland verges, and it also occurs in secondary forest.

References

AGUILAR Héctor F. & Rafael F. AGUILAR H., 2012.- Redescripción del Gualí Aburria aburri (Lesson, 1828), (Craciformes: Cracidae) con notas sobre el nido y el huevo Rev. Ecol. Lat. Am. 17(3): 53-61  www.cires.org.ve

wattled guan
Birds of the Northern Andes
wattled guan
Taxa named by René Lesson
Taxonomy articles created by Polbot